EH-domain containing 4, also known as EHD4, is a human gene belonging to the EHD protein family.

References

EH-domain-containing proteins